Comarques Centrals is one of the seven territories defined by the Regional Plan of Catalonia. It is located in the central part of Catalonia and will be formed by five comarques: Anoia, Bages, Berguedà, Osona, Solsonès and Moianès. The most important city is Manresa.

References

 
Geography of Catalonia